Nibanga Nendi is of one of the Reef Islands located in Temotu Province of the independent nation of the Solomon Islands. The spelling of the island's name is various: Nibanga, Nimanu, Banga Ndeni.

References

Islands of the Solomon Islands
Polynesian outliers